Warren Anderson may refer to:

 Warren Anderson (Australian businessman) (born 1942), Australian businessman
 Warren Anderson (American businessman) (1921–2014), former chairman of Union Carbide
 Warren Anderson (ice hockey) (born 1952), Canadian Olympic ice hockey player 
 Warren M. Anderson (1915–2007), former New York politician
 Warren Melville Anderson (1894–1973), Australian major-general
 Warren Anderson, a character in the film 8mm

See also
 Philip Warren Anderson (1923–2020), American physicist